Matara City is a Sri Lankan professional football club based in the coastal city of Matara. They play in the highest football league of Sri Lanka, the Sri Lanka Champions League. The club was promoted to the Premier League in 2013.

Honours
Sri Lanka Champions League: 1
Winners: 2022

References

Football clubs in Sri Lanka